Colleen Wolstenholme (born 31 May 1963 in Antigonish, Nova Scotia) is a Canadian artist. Wolstenholme is best known for her sculptures of oversized pharmaceutical drugs.

Her work is included in the collections of the National Gallery of Canada and the Art Gallery of Nova Scotia. Her public artwork Buspar Column, located near the Montreal Museum of Fine Arts, is in the collection of the city of Montreal.

References

External links 
 

1963 births
Living people
Artists from Nova Scotia
Canadian women sculptors
People from Antigonish, Nova Scotia
21st-century Canadian sculptors
21st-century Canadian women artists